The Commonwealth of Catalonia was a deliberative assembly made up of the councillors of the four provinces of Catalonia. Promoted in its final stages of gestation by the Regionalist League of Catalonia, it was strongly endorsed by municipal referendum in October 1913.

The Commonwealth was created in 1914 (symbolically the 200th anniversary of the year of the loss of governing institutions independent of the Spanish central administration) and was disbanded and outlawed in 1925 during Miguel Primo de Rivera's dictatorship.

Although it had only administrative functions and its powers did not go beyond those of the provincial councils, it had great symbolic and practical importance: it represented the first recognition by the Spanish State of the identity and territorial unity of Catalonia since 1714. and was responsible for the creation of many public institutions in health, culture and technical education and science and notably for the support of the Catalan language.

History

The lower house of the Spanish Parliament approved the creation of a Commonwealth but with limited powers compared to those originally envisioned for it by its promoters. The Spanish Senate never approved the creation of the authority. On 18 December 1913 the king signed the law granting all Spanish provinces the right to group themselves into associations or commonwealths. Catalonia was to prove to be the only commonwealth so formed.

The first President of the Commonwealth of Catalonia was Enric Prat de la Riba and the second was the architect Josep Puig i Cadafalch, both of the Lliga Regionalista, who led a programme to create an efficient infrastructure of roads and ports, hydraulic works, railways, telephones, charities and healthcare. The Commonwealth also undertook initiatives to increase agricultural and forest yields, introducing technological improvements, the improvement of services and education, and promoting education in technologies necessary for Catalan industry.

The Commonwealth was dissolved and outlawed under Miguel Primo de Rivera's dictatorship on 20 March 1925.

Structure 
The Assembly of the Commonwealth was initially made up of 36 for councillors from Province of Barcelona and 20 from each of the Provinces of Tarragona, Girona and Lleida) and elected Enric Prat de la Riba, leader of the Regionalist League, as president of the Commonwealth on 6 April 1914. In addition to the assembly and the president, the Commonwealth included an Executive council made up of 2 councillors from each province.

Legacy 

Prat de la Riba also created, the Escola de l'Administració Local (School of Local Administration), and required Catalan civil servants to have attended this institution.

Another important effort of the Commonwealth was the promotion of the work of Pompeu Fabra, who was chiefly responsible for the current Catalan writing system and linguistic standard.

On 25 January 1919, the Commonwealth approved a draft Statute of Autonomy. This Statute envisaged an autonomous government made up of a parliament, an executive and a governor-general, defined an autonomous financial framework and delineated the powers of the state and a government of Catalonia. The draft was rejected by the Spanish government, but it remained a point of reference for the drafting of the 1932 Statute of Autonomy.

References

External links

See also
 Generalitat de Catalunya
 Catalan Republic (1931)
 Statute of Autonomy of Catalonia of 1932
 List of presidents of the Government of Catalonia

Politics of Catalonia
History of Catalonia
1914 establishments in Spain
1925 disestablishments in Spain